The Clinton Owls were a Minor League Baseball team based in Clinton, Iowa, United States, that operated in the Illinois–Indiana–Iowa League in 1937–1938 as an affiliate of the Brooklyn Dodgers. From 1939–1940 they were an affiliate of the New York Giants and were known as the Clinton Giants. The team was disbanded at the onset of World War II. Today, the Clinton franchise is the Clinton LumberKings who still play at Riverview Stadium, now called NelsonCorp Field.

Notable players

 Sam Nahem (1915–2004), Major League Baseball pitcher

External links
Clinton, Iowa baseball reference
Clinton Owls book excerpt

Defunct minor league baseball teams
Brooklyn Dodgers minor league affiliates
Clinton, Iowa
Illinois-Indiana-Iowa League teams
Defunct baseball teams in Iowa
Baseball teams disestablished in 1938
Baseball teams established in 1937